Li Zhiyi (born Wudi County, Shandong; c. 1048–1117) courtesy name Duanshu was a Song Dynasty Chinese poet. 

He married Hu Shuxiu (1047–1105) and passed the imperial examinations in 1070 with a jinshi degree. He became a disciple and part of the Yuanyou circle that included Su Shi. 

His best known work, the Busuanzi ('Song of Divination'), is included in the poetry collection 300 Song Ci. Its first verse is referenced in the contemporary novel The Three-Body Problem.

References

1040s births
1117 deaths